Conostephium papillosum is a species of flowering plant in the family Ericaceae and is endemic to the south of Western Australia. It is a compact shrub with erect, narrowly elliptic or narrowly egg-shaped leaves with the narrower end toward the base, and pendulous, spindle-shaped, cream to straw-coloured and dark purple flowers.

Description
Both sides of the leaves are sparsely hairy or glabrous. The flowers are more or less pendulous with overlapping bracts at the base.

Taxonomy and naming
Conostephium papillosum was first formally described in 2013 by Michael Hislop in the journal Nuytsia from specimens he collected north of Condingup in 2006. The specific epithet (papillosum) means "papillate", referring to the texture of part of the petal tube.

Distribution and habitat
This species usually grows in mallee woodland, sometimes around saline depressions and is found from north-east of Esperance to Israelite Bay in the Esperance Plains and Mallee bioregions of southern Western Australia.

Conservation status
This conostephium is listed as "not threatened" by the Western Australian Government Department of Biodiversity, Conservation and Attractions.

References

papillosum
Epacridoideae
Eudicots of Western Australia
Ericales of Australia
Endemic flora of Western Australia
Plants described in 2013